The 69th Texas Legislature met in regular session from January 8, 1985, to May 27, 1985, and in three subsequent special called sessions (see below). All members present during this session were elected in the 1984 general elections.

Sessions
Regular Session: January 8, 1985 - May 27, 1985
1st Called Session: May 28, 1985 - May 30, 1985
2nd Called Session: August 6, 1986 - September 4, 1986
3rd Called Session: September 8, 1986 - September 30, 1986

Party summary

Senate

House

Officers

Senate
 Lieutenant Governor: William P. Hobby, Jr., Democrat
 President Pro Tempore (regular session): Ray Farabee, Democrat
 President Pro Tempore (1st called session): Carlos Truan, Democrat
 President Pro Tempore (2nd called session): Carlos Truan, Democrat
 President Pro Tempore (3rd called session): Carlos Truan, Democrat

House
 Speaker of the House: Gibson D. "Gib" Lewis, Democrat

Members

Senate

Dist. 1
 Richard Anderson (D), Marshall

Dist. 2
 Ted Lyon (D), Rockwall

Dist. 3
 Roy Blake, Sr. (D), Jasper

Dist. 4
 Carl A. Parker (D), Port Arthur

Dist. 5
 Kent A. Caperton (D), Bryan

Dist. 6
 Lindon Williams (D), Houston

Dist. 7
 Don Henderson (R), Houston

Dist. 8
 O.H. "Ike" Harris (R), Dallas

Dist. 9
 Chet Edwards (D), Duncanville

Dist. 10
 Bob McFarland (R), Arlington

Dist. 11
 Chet Brooks (D), Houston

Dist. 12
 Hugh Q. Parmer (D), Fort Worth

Dist. 13
 Craig Washington (D), Houston

Dist. 14
 Gonzalo Barrientos (D), Austin

Dist. 15
 John Whitmire (D), Houston

Dist. 16
 John N. Leedom (R), Dallas

Dist. 17
 J. E. "Buster" Brown (R), Galveston

Dist. 18
 John Sharp (D), Victoria

Dist. 19
 Glenn Kothmann (D), San Antonio

Dist. 20
 Carlos Truan (D), Corpus Christi

Dist. 21
 John Traeger (D), Seguin

Dist. 22
 Bob Glasgow (D), Stephenville

Dist. 23
 Oscar Mauzy (D), Dallas

Dist. 24
 Grant Jones (D), Abilene

Dist. 25
 Bill Sims (D), San Angelo

Dist. 26
 Cyndi Taylor Krier (R), San Antonio

Dist. 27
 Hector Uribe (D), Brownsville

Dist. 28
 John T. Montford (D), Lubbock

Dist. 29
 Tati Santiesteban (D), El Paso

Dist. 30
 Ray Farabee (D), Wichita Falls

Dist. 31
 Bill Sarpalius (D), Amarillo

House

External links

69th Texas Legislature
1985 in Texas
1985 U.S. legislative sessions